Kjetil Øvrelid Strand (born 2 October 1979) is a Norwegian handball player. Strand played for Bjerringbro Silkeborg in Denmark before the 2006 European Championship. Afterwards he signed a contract with Aab Håndbold.

On 2 February 2006 he scored 19 goals, a Norwegian record, in a Main Group Stage game against Iceland in the European Championship.  Strand also holds the record for number of goals scored in a single season in the Norwegian league: 281.  He set the record while playing for Stavanger Håndball in 2002/2003 season. In 2003 he was awarded Player of the year in Norwegian handball.

References

External links
 

Norwegian male handball players
1979 births
Living people
Aalborg Håndbold players